Thalictrum rochebruneanum, called the lavender mist meadow rue, is a species of flowering plant in the genus Thalictrum, native to the Korean Peninsula and Japan. A clumping perennial topped with a loose spray of small medium violet flowers with yellow stamens, and sometimes reaching , it has gained the Royal Horticultural Society's Award of Garden Merit.

References

rochebruneanum
Flora of Korea
Flora of Japan
Garden plants of Asia
Plants described in 1878